Events from the year 1848 in Sweden

Incumbents
 Monarch – Oscar I

Events
 18-21 March - A series of riots, Marsoroligheterna, takes place in the capital inspired by the Revolutions of 1848
 - The Tales of Ensign Stål is published.
 - The Cause célèbre of Sophie Sager.
 - HDK (school) is established.
 - Cecilia Fryxell open her first school: her schools is to become influential in the education of females.
 - A new type of ferry traffic, with boats propelled by hand-operated paddle wheels instead of boats managed by oars by the Rower woman, are introduced in Stockholm. 
 - Banditen : berättelse by August Blanche
 - Catharina Månsdotter by Wilhelmina Stålberg
 - Fänrik Ståls sägner by Johan Ludvig Runeberg
 - Första älskarinnan by August Blanche
 - Hittebarnet by August Blanche

Births

 2 May – Harald Hjärne, historian (died 1922)

Deaths
 13 February – Sophie von Knorring, writer (born 1797) 
 16 February – Sophie Stebnowska, opera singer and harpsichordist 
 13 March – Johan Niclas Byström, sculptor  (born 1783) 
 7 August - Jöns Jacob Berzelius, chemist  (born 1779)
 Gustafva Röhl, educator (born 1798)
 Katarina Erlandsdotter textile artist (born 1771)

References

 
Years of the 19th century in Sweden